Pradeep Chokli is an Indian film director who works in Malayalam language films. He made his directorial debut with Pradakshinam, a Manoj K. Jayan starrer in 1994. Pradeep is often mentioned about the critically acclaimed film English Medium starring Sreenivasan and Mukesh.

Pradeep has also worked as an art director for more than 30 films starting from P.A. Backer's Charam and has also worked as a Film poster designer as well.

Filmography

References

External links
 

Malayalam film directors
Film directors from Kerala
Living people
21st-century Indian film directors
Year of birth missing (living people)